Anna of Lorraine (25 July 1522 – 15 May 1568) was a princess of the House of Lorraine. She was Princess of Orange by her first marriage to René of Châlon, and Duchess of Aarschot by her second marriage to Philippe II of Croÿ.

Life
Anna was the daughter of Antoine the Good, Duke of Lorraine and Renée of Bourbon-Montpensier. Her maternal grandparents were Gilbert of Bourbon, Count of Montpensier, and Clara Gonzaga. Her brothers were Francis I, Duke of Lorraine and Nicolas, Duke of Mercœur.

She married René of Châlon, Prince of Orange on 22 August 1540 at Bar-le-Duc. They had a single daughter, Maria, born in 1544, who only lived three weeks and was buried in the Grote Kerk at Breda.

René died in 1544, and all of his lands were inherited by William the Silent, his cousin. Anna remarried to Philip II, Duke of Aarschot, on 9 July 1548. They had one son, Charles Philippe de Croÿ, born on 1 September 1549 in Brussels. He was the Prince of Croÿ and in 1580 married  (1550 – after 1635), Countess of Fontenoy-le-Château. He died on 25 November 1613 in Burgundy.

She died in Diest.

References

Sources 

 

1522 births
1568 deaths
French duchesses
Anna of Lorraine
Anna of Lorraine